1129 Neujmina is an Eos asteroid from the outer regions of the asteroid belt. It was discovered on 8 August 1929, by astronomer Praskoviya Parchomenko at the Simeiz Observatory on the Crimean peninsula. It was named after Soviet astronomer Grigory Neujmin.

Orbit and classification 

Neujmina is a member the Eos family, the largest asteroid family of the outer main belt consisting of nearly 10,000 asteroids. It orbits the Sun at a distance of 2.8–3.3 AU once every 5 years and 3 months (1,919 days). Its orbit has an eccentricity of 0.08 and an inclination of 9° with respect to the ecliptic. The body's observation arc begins four weeks after its official discovery observation at Simeiz.

Naming 

This minor planet was named after Georgian–Russian astronomer Grigory Neujmin (1885–1946), a discoverer of minor planets and comets, observer at Pulkovo Observatory and college of Parchomenko at Simeiz Observatory. The  was mentioned in The Names of the Minor Planets by Paul Herget in 1955. The lunar crater Neujmin was also named in his honor.

Physical characteristics 

In the Tholen classification, Neujmina is a stony S-type asteroid.

Rotation period 

In March 2011, a rotational lightcurve of Neujmina was obtained from photometric observations at the Oakley Southern Sky Observatory  in Australia. Lightcurve analysis gave a well-defined rotation period of 5.0844 hours with a brightness variation of 0.20 magnitude. Previous measurements in 1984 and 2008, gave a period of 5.089 and 7.61 hours with an amplitude of 0.15 and 0.06 magnitude, respectively.

Diameter and albedo 

According to the surveys carried out by the Infrared Astronomical Satellite IRAS, the Japanese Akari satellite and the NEOWISE mission of NASA's Wide-field Infrared Survey Explorer, Neujmina measures between 30.99 and 39.246 kilometers in diameter and its surface has an albedo between 0.0999 and 0.138. The Collaborative Asteroid Lightcurve Link derives an albedo of 0.1270 and a diameter of 34.80 kilometers based on an absolute magnitude of 10.15.

References

External links 
 Lightcurve Database Query (LCDB), at www.minorplanet.info
 Dictionary of Minor Planet Names, Google books
 Asteroids and comets rotation curves, CdR – Geneva Observatory, Raoul Behrend
 Discovery Circumstances: Numbered Minor Planets (1)-(5000) – Minor Planet Center
 
 

001129
Discoveries by Praskovjya Parchomenko
Named minor planets
001129
19290808